Fazlul Halim Chowdhury (1 August 19309 April 1996) was a fellow of the Bangladesh Academy of Sciences and one of the longest-serving Vice-Chancellors of the University of Dhaka. He made pioneering contributions to the development of physical chemistry in Bangladesh, publishing more than 20 articles. He focused on cellulose fibers (especially jute), polyelectrolytes, and proteins.

Early life
Chowdhury was born on 1 August 1930 to Abdul Aziz Chowdhury, an educationist and Afifa Khatun of Kunja Sreepur village, in Comilla District, Bengal Presidency.

Education
SSC, Noakhali R.K. Zilla H.E. School, 1945
HSC, Comilla Victoria College, 1947
BSc (Hons), Department of Chemistry, University of Dhaka, First in the First Class
MSc, Department of Chemistry, University of Dhaka, First in the First Class, 1951
PhD, Manchester University, UK (Thesis entitled "The Acid Behaviour of Carboxylic Derivatives", 5 July 1956) Awarded   "Royal Commission for the Exhibition of 1851" to pursue PhD studies.

Academic career
Lecturer, 1952–53; assistant professor, 195658, Department of Chemistry, Dhaka University
Professor, Department of Chemistry and Applied Chemistry, Rajshahi University, 195890
Nuffield Fellow, Cambridge University, U.K. 196062
Dean, Faculty of Science, Rajshahi University, 1972
Commonwealth Senior Fellow, Cambridge University, U.K. 197374
Member, University Grants Commission (UGC), 197476
Vice Chancellor, University of Dhaka, 197683
Fellow of Bangladesh Academy of Sciences, 1979 
Asia Foundation Fellowship, 1984
President, Bangladesh Chemical Society, 198486
Senior Advisor in Basic Sciences, UNESCO, New Delhi, 198590
University of Asia Pacific, Dhaka, 199596
President, The Rajshahi University Teachers Association
Provost, Abdul Latif Hall, Rajshahi University
Senior Researcher, American Association for the Advancement of Science Washington D.C.

Research
Chowdhury made pioneering contributions to the development of physical chemistry in the country, publishing more than 20 articles. He focused on cellulose fibers (of jute in particular), polyelectrolytes, and proteins. He also guided a number of PhD theses.

References 

1930 births
1996 deaths
Fellows of Bangladesh Academy of Sciences
Bangladeshi chemists
Physical chemists
Vice-Chancellors of the University of Dhaka
Academic staff of the University of Rajshahi
Comilla Victoria Government College alumni